Charalambos Kyriakou may refer to:

 Charalambos Kyriakou (footballer, born 1989), Cypriot footballer for Ethnikos Achna
 Charalambos Kyriakou (footballer, born 1995), Cypriot footballer for Apollon Limassol